Kingsford House is a historic home located at Oswego in Oswego County, New York.   It is a large -story brick residence.  Built about 1870 in the Italianate style, it was extensively reconfigured and enlarged in 1912–1913 in the Tudor Revival style. Along the north and east edge of the property is a terrace wall built of cut limestone blocks and topped by a cast and wrought iron fence.

It was listed on the National Register of Historic Places in 1997.

References

Houses on the National Register of Historic Places in New York (state)
Houses completed in 1870
Houses in Oswego County, New York
National Register of Historic Places in Oswego County, New York